Tomba is a Meitei ethnic male given name, meaning little, small, tiny, young. 
Notable people with this given name are:
 Kangabam Tomba, Indian actor
 Wangkheirakpam Tomba Singh, Indian footballer

See also 
 Tomba (disambiguation)
 Tombi (Meitei name)